HD 59686 b is an extrasolar planet that orbits at 91.1% of distance between Earth and the Sun or 0.911 AU in a very circular orbit of the giant star HD 59686.

References
 

Gemini (constellation)
Giant planets
Exoplanets discovered in 2003
Exoplanets detected by radial velocity